Dizzy is a Canadian indie pop band from Oshawa, Ontario, whose debut album Baby Teeth won the Juno Award for Alternative Album of the Year at the Juno Awards of 2019.

Consisting of vocalist Katie Munshaw and instrumentalists Alex, Mackenzie and Charlie Spencer, the group released Baby Teeth in 2018. The album was promoted with a concert tour in Canada, the United States and Europe, and the tracks "Swim", "Pretty Thing" and "Backstroke" were released as singles.

In addition to the Alternative Album of the Year category, the group were also nominated for Breakthrough Group of the Year.

On February 26, 2020 Dizzy released the single "Sunflower", and on July 31, 2020 the band released their sophomore album, The Sun and Her Scorch. The album received another Juno Award nomination for Alternative Album of the Year at the Juno Awards of 2021.

Members 
 Katie Munshaw – lead vocals
 Alex Spencer – guitar
 Mackenzie Spencer – bass, vocals
 Charlie Spencer – drums, synthesizer, guitar, vocals

Discography

Studio albums

Extended plays

Singles

Awards and nominations

References

External links

Canadian indie pop groups
Musical groups from Oshawa
Juno Award for Alternative Album of the Year winners
Musical groups established in 2015
2015 establishments in Ontario